James Hugh Calum Laurie  (born 11 June 1959) is an English actor, comedian, writer, and musician. He first gained recognition for his work as one half of the comedy double act Fry and Laurie with Stephen Fry. The two men acted together in a number of projects during the 1980s and 1990s, including the BBC sketch comedy series A Bit of Fry & Laurie and the P. G. Wodehouse adaptation Jeeves and Wooster. He appeared in two series of the period comedy Blackadder (1987–1989) alongside Rowan Atkinson.

From 2004 to 2012, Laurie starred as Dr. Gregory House on the Fox medical drama series House. He received two Golden Globe Awards and many other accolades for the role, and was listed in the 2011 Guinness World Records as the most watched leading man on television and was one of the highest-paid actors in a television drama, earning £250,000 ($409,000) per episode of House. His other television credits include arms dealer Richard Onslow Roper in the miniseries The Night Manager (2016), for which he won his third Golden Globe Award, and Senator Tom James in the HBO sitcom Veep (2012–2019), for which he received his 10th Emmy Award nomination.

Laurie has also appeared in films, including Peter's Friends (1992), Sense and Sensibility (1995), 101 Dalmatians (1996), The Borrowers (1997), The Man in the Iron Mask (1998), Stuart Little (1999), Life with Judy Garland: Me and My Shadows (2001), Arthur Christmas (2011) in which he voiced Steven Claus, and The Personal History of David Copperfield (2020). 

Laurie has won three Golden Globe Awards and two Screen Actors Guild Awards, and has been nominated for 10 Primetime Emmy Awards. Outside of acting, Laurie released the blues albums Let Them Talk (2011) and Didn't It Rain (2013), both to favourable reviews, and authored the novel The Gun Seller (1996). He was appointed OBE in the 2007 New Year Honours and CBE in the 2018 New Year Honours, both for services to drama.

Early life
James Hugh Calum Laurie was born on 11 June 1959, in the Blackbird Leys area of Oxford, the youngest of four children of Patricia (née Laidlaw) and William George Ranald Mundell "Ran" Laurie, who was a physician and winner of an Olympic gold medal in the coxless pairs (rowing) at the 1948 London Games. He has an older brother, Charles Alexander Lyon Mundell Laurie, and two older sisters, Susan and Janet. He had a strained relationship with his mother, whom he noted as "Presbyterian by character, by mood". He later said, "I was frustration to her. She didn't like me." His mother died from motor neurone disease in 1989, at the age of 73. According to Laurie, she endured the disease for two years and suffered "painful, plodding paralysis" while being cared for by Laurie's father, whom he has called "the sweetest man in the whole world".

Laurie's parents, who were both of Scottish descent, attended St Columba's Presbyterian Church (now United Reformed Church) in Oxford. He notes that "belief in God didn't play a large role" in his home, but "a certain attitude to life and the living of it did". He followed this by stating, "Pleasure was something that was treated with great suspicion, pleasure was something that... I was going to say it had to be earned but even the earning of it didn't really work. It was something to this day, I mean, I carry that with me. I find pleasure a difficult thing; I don't know what you do with it, I don't know where to put it." He later stated, "I don't believe in God, but I have this idea that if there were a God, or destiny of some kind looking down on us, that if he saw you taking anything for granted, he'd take it away."

Laurie was brought up in Oxford and attended the Dragon School from ages seven to 13, later stating, "I was, in truth, a horrible child. Not much given to things of a 'bookey' nature, I spent a large part of my youth smoking Number Six and cheating in French vocabulary tests." He went on to Eton College, which he described as "the most private of private schools". He arrived at Selwyn College, Cambridge, in 1978, which he says he attended "as a result of family tradition" since his father went there. Laurie notes that his father was a successful rower at Cambridge and that he was "trying to follow in [his] father's footsteps". He studied archaeology and anthropology, specialising in social anthropology, and graduated with third-class honours in 1981.

Like his father, Laurie rowed at school and university. In 1977, he was a member of the junior coxed pair that won the British national title before representing Britain's Youth Team at the 1977 Junior World Rowing Championships. In 1980, Laurie and his rowing partner, J.S. Palmer, were runners-up in the Silver Goblets coxless pairs for Eton Vikings rowing club. He also achieved a Blue while taking part in the 1980 Oxford and Cambridge Boat Race. Cambridge lost that year by five feet. During this time, Laurie was training for up to eight hours a day and was on course to become an Olympic-standard rower. He is a member of the Leander Club, one of the oldest rowing clubs in the world, and was a member of the Hermes Club and Hawks' Club.

Career

Acting

Forced to abandon rowing during a bout of glandular fever, Laurie joined the Cambridge Footlights, a university dramatic club that has produced many well-known actors and comedians. There he met Emma Thompson, with whom he had a romantic relationship; the two remain good friends. She introduced him to his future comedy partner, Stephen Fry. Laurie, Fry and Thompson later parodied themselves as the University Challenge representatives of "Footlights College, Oxbridge" in "Bambi", an episode of The Young Ones, with the series' co-writer Ben Elton completing their team.

In 1980–81, his final year at university, besides rowing, Laurie was president of the Footlights, with Thompson as vice-president. They took their annual revue, The Cellar Tapes, to the Edinburgh Fringe Festival and won the first Perrier Comedy Award. The revue was written principally by Laurie and Fry, and the cast also included Thompson, Tony Slattery, Paul Shearer and Penny Dwyer. The Perrier Award led to a West End transfer for The Cellar Tapes and a television version of the revue, broadcast in May 1982. It resulted in Laurie, Fry and Thompson being selected, along with Ben Elton, Robbie Coltrane and Siobhan Redmond to write and appear in a new sketch comedy show for Granada Television, Alfresco, which ran for two series.

Fry and Laurie worked together on various projects throughout the 1980s and 1990s. Among them were the Blackadder series, written by Ben Elton and Richard Curtis, starring Rowan Atkinson, with Laurie in various roles, including Prince George and Lieutenant George. Other projects followed, of which one was their BBC sketch comedy series A Bit of Fry & Laurie; another project was Jeeves and Wooster, an adaptation of P. G. Wodehouse's stories, in which Laurie played Jeeves's employer, the amiable twit Bertie Wooster. He and Fry participated in charity stage events, such as Hysteria! 1, 2 & 3 and Amnesty International's The Secret Policeman's Third Ball, Comic Relief TV shows and the variety show Fry and Laurie Host a Christmas Night with the Stars. They collaborated again on the film Peter's Friends (1992) and came together for a retrospective show in 2010 titled Fry and Laurie Reunited.

Laurie starred in the Thames Television film Letters from a Bomber Pilot (1985) directed by David Hodgson. This was a serious acting role, the film being dramatised from the letters home of Pilot Officer J.R.A. "Bob" Hodgson, a pilot in RAF Bomber Command, who was killed in action in 1943.

Laurie appeared in the music videos for the 1986 single "Experiment IV" by Kate Bush, and the 1992 Annie Lennox single "Walking on Broken Glass" in British Regency period costume alongside John Malkovich. Laurie appeared in the Spice Girls' film  Spice World (1997) and had a brief guest-starring role on Friends in "The One with Ross's Wedding" (1998).

Laurie's later film appearances include Sense and Sensibility (1995), adapted by and starring Emma Thompson; the Disney live-action film 101 Dalmatians (1996), where he played Jasper, one of the bumbling criminals hired to kidnap the puppies; Elton's adaptation of his novel Inconceivable, Maybe Baby (2000); Girl from Rio; the 2004 adaptation of The Flight of the Phoenix, and Stuart Little.

Since 2002, Laurie has appeared in a range of British television dramas, guest-starring that year in two episodes of the first season of the spy thriller series Spooks on BBC One. In 2003, he starred in and also directed ITV's comedy-drama series fortysomething (in one episode of which Stephen Fry appears). In 2001, he voiced the character of a bar patron in the Family Guy episode "One If by Clam, Two If by Sea". Laurie voiced the character of Mr. Wolf in the cartoon Preston Pig. He was a panellist on the first episode of QI, alongside Fry as host. In 2004, Laurie guest-starred as a professor in charge of a space probe called Beagle, on The Lenny Henry Show.

Between 2004 and 2012, Laurie starred as an acerbic physician specialising in diagnostic medicine, Dr. Gregory House, in the Fox medical drama House. For his portrayal, he assumed an American accent. He was in Namibia filming Flight of the Phoenix and recorded his audition tape for the show in the bathroom of the hotel, as it was the only place he could get enough light. Jacob Vargas operated the camera for the audition tape. Laurie's American accent was so convincing that executive producer Bryan Singer, who was unaware at the time that Laurie was British, pointed to him as an example of just the kind of "compelling American actor" he had been looking for. Laurie also adopted the accent between takes on the set of House, as well as during script read-throughs, although he used his native accent when directing the episode "Lockdown". He also served as director for the episode "The C-Word".

Laurie was nominated for an Emmy Award for his role in House in 2005. Although he did not win, he did receive a Golden Globe in both 2006 and 2007 for his work on the series and the Screen Actors Guild award in 2007 and 2009. Laurie was also awarded a large increase in salary, from what was rumoured to be a mid-range five-figure sum to $350,000 per episode. Laurie was not nominated for the 2006 Emmys, apparently to the outrage of Fox executives, but he still appeared in a scripted, pre-taped intro, where he parodied his House character by rapidly diagnosing host Conan O'Brien and then proceeded to grope him as the latter asked him for help to get to the Emmys on time. He would later go on to speak in French while presenting an Emmy with Dame Helen Mirren, and has since been nominated in 2007, 2008, 2009, 2010, and 2011.

Laurie was initially cast as Perry White, the editor of the Daily Planet, in Singer's film Superman Returns but had to bow out of the project because of his commitment to House. In July 2006, Laurie appeared on Inside the Actors Studio, where he also performed one of his own comic songs, "Mystery", accompanying himself on the piano. He hosted NBC's Saturday Night Live, in which he appeared in drag in a sketch about a man (Kenan Thompson) with a broken leg who accuses his doctor of being dishonest. Laurie played the man's wife.

In August 2007, Laurie appeared on BBC Four's documentary Stephen Fry: 50 Not Out, filmed in celebration of Fry's 50th birthday. In 2008, he took part in Blackadder Rides Again and appeared as Captain James Biggs in Street Kings, opposite Keanu Reeves and Forest Whitaker, and then in 2009 as the eccentric Dr. Cockroach, PhD in DreamWorks' Monsters vs. Aliens. He also hosted Saturday Night Live for the second time on the Christmas show in which he sang a medley of three-second Christmas songs to close his monologue. In 2009, Laurie returned to guest star in another Family Guy episode, "Business Guy", parodying Gregory House. In 2010, Laurie guest starred in The Simpsons episode "Treehouse of Horror XXI" as Roger, a castaway who is planning a murder scheme on a ship during Homer and Marge's second honeymoon.

On 8 February 2012, Fox announced that season eight of House would be the last. On 13 June 2012, the media announced that Laurie was in negotiations to play the villain in RoboCop, a remake of the original RoboCop film. These negotiations ultimately fell through and Laurie passed on the project. In 2012, Laurie starred in an independent feature called The Oranges that had a limited release. The New York Post felt that he was "less-than-ideally cast" in the role of a dad who has an affair with his neighbour's daughter, played by Leighton Meester. The Star-Ledger of Newark, New Jersey thought that he was "particularly good". After the end of House Laurie took a three-year hiatus from film and TV work.

Laurie was in negotiations to be cast in the role of Blackbeard for the 2014 series Crossbones. However, the role went to John Malkovich. In 2015 he returned to TV work with a recurring role on Veep as Tom James, a role written specifically for him after showrunner Armando Iannucci heard he was a fan of the show. Laurie continued to recur on the show until the final season in 2019. The same year he played the villain David Nix in Brad Bird's 2015 film Tomorrowland.

Laurie played Richard Onslow Roper in the BBC 1 mini-series The Night Manager. The series started filming in spring 2015 and aired first on the BBC. He was nominated for two Emmys for his work on the miniseries and won the Golden Globe Award for Best Supporting Actor – Series, Miniseries or Television Film.

Laurie starred as Dr. Eldon Chance, a San Francisco-based forensic neuropsychiatrist in the Hulu thriller series Chance which lasted for two seasons from 2016 to 2017. In 2018 Laurie had a small role in the critically panned film Holmes & Watson.

In 2019 Laurie appeared in Veep creator Armando Iannucci's film The Personal History of David Copperfield, an adaptation of the novel David Copperfield by Charles Dickens. That same year it was announced he would also work with Iannucci on the upcoming space comedy Avenue 5 for HBO. Season 2 of Avenue 5 was released on 10 October 2022, with Laurie reprising his role as Captain Ryan.

It was reported in February 2023 that Laurie would be the feature guest star for the third season of Tehran.

Music

Laurie took piano lessons from the age of six. He sings and plays the piano, guitar, drums, harmonica, and saxophone. He has displayed his musical talents throughout his acting career, such as on A Bit of Fry & Laurie, Jeeves and Wooster, House and when he hosted Saturday Night Live in October 2006. He is a vocalist and keyboard player for the Los Angeles charity rock group Band From TV.

Additionally, following Meat Loaf's appearance in the House episode "Simple Explanation", Laurie played piano as a special guest on the song "If I Can't Have You" from Meat Loaf's 2010 album Hang Cool Teddy Bear. Laurie co-wrote and performed the humorous blues song, "Sperm Test in the Morning", in the film Maybe Baby.

On House, Laurie played several classic rock 'n roll instruments including Gibson Flying V and Les Paul guitars. His character has a Hammond B-3 organ in his home and on one episode performed the introduction to Procol Harum's classic "Whiter Shade of Pale".

On 26 July 2010, it was announced that Laurie would be releasing a blues album after signing a contract with Warner Bros. Records. The album, called Let Them Talk, was released in France on 18 April 2011 and in Germany on 29 April. The album features collaborations from well-known artists such as Tom Jones, Irma Thomas and Dr. John.

On 1 May 2011, Laurie and a jazz quintet closed the 2011 Cheltenham Jazz Festival to great acclaim. He followed that up as the subject of the 15 May 2011 episode of ITV's series Perspectives, explaining his love for the music of New Orleans and playing music, from his album Let Them Talk, at studios and live venues in the city itself. He was the subject of PBS Great Performances Let them Talk, also about New Orleans jazz, first broadcast on 30 September 2011.<ref>Hugh Laurie: Let Them Talk, PBS Great Performances</ref>

His second album, Didn't It Rain, was released in the UK on 6 May 2013. In the same year he played at the  together with his band. This concert was filmed and later released as Live on the Queen Mary on DVD and Blu-ray.

Writing
In 1996, Laurie's first novel, The Gun Seller, an intricate thriller laced with Wodehouseian humour, was published and became a best-seller. He has since been working on the screenplay for a film version. His second novel, The Paper Soldier, was scheduled for September 2009 but has yet to appear.

Personal life
Laurie married theatre administrator Jo Green on 16 June 1989 in the Camden area of London. They have three children, Charlie, Bill, and Rebecca. Laurie's elder son Charlie played a small role as baby William in A Bit of Fry & Laurie, during a sketch titled "Special Squad". His daughter Rebecca had a role in the film Wit as five-year-old Vivian Bearing. Stephen Fry, Laurie's best friend and long-time comedy partner, was the best man at his wedding and is the godfather of his children.

While appearing on Inside the Actors Studio in 2006, he discussed his struggles with severe clinical depression. He told host James Lipton that he first concluded he had a problem whilst driving in a charity demolition derby, during which he realised that seeing two cars collide and explode made him feel bored rather than excited or frightened; he quipped that "boredom is not an appropriate response to exploding cars". As of 2006 he was having regular sessions with a psychotherapist.

Laurie admires the writings of P. G. Wodehouse, explaining in a 27 May 1999 article in The Daily Telegraph how reading Wodehouse novels had saved his life. In an interview also in The Daily Telegraph, he confirmed that he is an atheist. He is an avid motorcycle enthusiast and has two motorbikes, one at his London home and one at his Los Angeles home. His bike in the U.S. is a Triumph Bonneville, his self-proclaimed "feeble attempt to fly the British flag".

In June 2013, Laurie was the guest on BBC Radio 4's Desert Island Discs, where he chose tracks from Joe Cocker, Sister Rosetta Tharpe, Randy Newman, Professor Longhair, Son House, Nina Simone, Lester Young–Buddy Rich Trio, and Van Morrison as his eight favourite discs. This was his second appearance on the show, having previously been on a 1996 episode, where he chose tracks by Muddy Waters, Max Bruch, the Rolling Stones, Frank Sinatra with Count Basie, Ian Dury and the Blockheads, Erich Wolfgang Korngold, and Van Morrison.

Laurie is a supporter of Arsenal FC.

Recognition
Laurie has won three Golden Globe Awards and two Screen Actors Guild Awards, and has been nominated for 10 Primetime Emmy Awards.

In March 2012, Laurie was made an Honorary Fellow of his alma mater'' Selwyn College, Cambridge.

In October 2016, he was awarded a star on the Hollywood Walk of Fame.

On 23 May 2007, Laurie was appointed Officer of the Order of the British Empire (OBE) for services to drama in the 2007 New Year Honours. He was promoted to Commander of the same Order (CBE) for his services to drama in the 2018 New Year Honours.

Filmography

Live-action performances

Film

Television

Voice performances

Documentaries

Video games

Discography

Albums

Singles

Featured singles

Other charting songs

Music videos

DVDs/Blu-ray

Awards and honours

Commonwealth honours
 Commonwealth honours

Scholastic
 University degrees

 Chancellor, visitor, governor, rector and fellowships

References

External links

Hugh Laurie | Culture | The Guardian
Hugh Laurie interview - Telegraph
HUGH LAURIE

1959 births
Living people
20th-century English comedians
20th-century English male actors
20th-century English male writers
20th-century English novelists
21st-century English comedians
21st-century English male actors
21st-century English male writers
21st-century English novelists
Alumni of Selwyn College, Cambridge
Audiobook narrators
Best Drama Actor Golden Globe (television) winners
Best Supporting Actor Golden Globe (television) winners
British male comedy actors
British male pianists
British sketch comedians
Cambridge University Boat Club rowers
Commanders of the Order of the British Empire
English atheists
English blues singers
English blues musicians
English expatriates in the United States
English people of Scottish descent
English pianists
English male film actors
English male comedians
English male novelists
English male screenwriters
English male singers
English male television actors
English male video game actors
English male voice actors
English screenwriters
Honorary Fellows of Selwyn College, Cambridge
Labour Party (UK) people
Male actors from Oxfordshire
Members of Leander Club
Outstanding Performance by a Male Actor in a Drama Series Screen Actors Guild Award winners
People educated at Eton College
People educated at The Dragon School
actors from Oxford
Warner Records artists